Jamal Musiala (born 26 February 2003) is a German professional footballer who plays as an attacking midfielder or winger for  club Bayern Munich and the Germany national team. Nicknamed "Bambi", Musiala is known for his world-class dribbling ability and is often considered one of the best attackers in the world.

Born in Germany to a Nigerian father and German mother, he was raised from the age of seven in England. Musiala represented both Germany and England at youth level, and eventually pledged his allegiance to the German national team for future games in February 2021, representing the side at UEFA Euro 2020 and the 2022 FIFA World Cup.

Early life
Musiala was born in Stuttgart, Germany to a British-Nigerian Yoruba father and German mother of Polish roots. He lived in Fulda until the age of seven, before moving to England with his family, where he remained for the rest of his childhood. He went to primary school at the Corpus Christi School in New Malden. For secondary school he went to the Whitgift School in Croydon. He was in the Chelsea academy for the last years of his childhood.

Club career

2019–20: Move to Bayern Munich and debut
In July 2019, aged 16, Musiala left Chelsea to join Bundesliga club Bayern Munich. On 3 June 2020, Musiala made his professional debut, coming on as a substitute for Bayern Munich II in their 3–2 win over Preußen Münster in the 3. Liga. On 20 June 2020, he made his Bundesliga debut against SC Freiburg, and he became the youngest player to play a match for Bayern in the Bundesliga, aged 17 years and 115 days.
Musiala was a part of the squad that won the 2019–20 UEFA Champions League, although he did not make any appearances in the tournament.

2020–21: First-team breakthrough
On 18 September 2020, Musiala scored his first Bundesliga goal in an 8–0 win over Schalke, to become Bayern's youngest goalscorer, aged 17 years 205 days, breaking the previous record of Roque Santa Cruz, aged 18 years 12 days. On 3 November, Musiala made his Champions League debut as a substitute to Thomas Müller in a 6–2 away win over Red Bull Salzburg. On 1 December, he started his first Champions League match in a 1–1 away draw against Atlético Madrid. On 23 February 2021, Musiala scored his first Champions League goal in a 4–1 away win over Lazio in the first leg of the round of 16 tie, becoming the competition's youngest goalscorer of both English and German nationalities. On 5 March, he signed his first professional contract at Bayern Munich until 2026.

2021–22
On 25 August 2021, Musiala scored his first two goals of the season in a 12–0 DFB Pokal away win over Bremer SV. Three days later, he then scored his first Bundesliga goal of the season in a 5–0 win over Hertha BSC. On 8 December 2021, Musiala scored his first Champions League goal of the season in a 3–0 win over Barcelona. On 23 April 2022, Musiala's strike sealed the title in a 3–1 victory over Borussia Dortmund in Der Klassiker, giving Bayern their tenth straight Bundesliga title.

International career
Musiala, who was also eligible to play for Nigeria via his father, represented both England and Germany at youth international level.

Youth

In November 2020, Musiala was called up to the England under-21 squad for the first time for their 2021 UEFA European Under-21 Championship qualification matches. He made his U21 debut as a substitute  during a 3–1 victory over Andorra under-21s at Molineux Stadium on 13 November 2020. He scored his first under-21 goal during a 5–0 win over Albania at Molineux Stadium on 17 November 2020. After choosing to represent England's under-21s, the German football association indicated that they had stopped pursuing Musiala, with youth team coach Meikel Schonweitz stating: "He has clearly signalled to us that he currently sees his future with the English national teams. We accept his decision and wish him all the best for his sporting career." Musiala had previously indicated that he felt more comfortable playing for England at youth level than for Germany, as he grew up as a footballer at Chelsea with other English players, whereas for Germany he did not know any of the other players.

Senior
On 24 February 2021, Musiala announced he had decided to represent his birth nation, Germany, for full international matches. He subsequently received his first call up to the senior team for 2022 FIFA World Cup qualifiers in March 2021, making his debut on 25 March 2021 as a 79th minute substitute in a 3–0 win against Iceland.

Euro 2020
On 19 May 2021, Musiala was selected to the squad for the UEFA Euro 2020. On 23 June 2021, he became the youngest German player to feature in a major tournament in a 2–2 draw with Hungary in Euro 2020, aged 18 years and 117 days. During the match, Musiala set up Leon Goretzka's late equalizer which sent Germany through to the round of 16. In doing so, he received praise from pundits and fans worldwide.

2022 World Cup qualification
On 11 October 2021, Musiala scored his first goal in a 4–0 win over North Macedonia during the 2022 World Cup qualification, becoming the second-youngest player to score for Germany, aged 18 years and 227 days, only behind Marius Hiller, aged 17 years and 241 days, in 1910.

2022 World Cup
On 10 November 2022, Musiala received a call-up for the 2022 FIFA World Cup in Qatar. On 23 November, he made his World Cup debut by starting against Japan, to become the first German teenager to feature in the competition since 1958, and the fourth youngest German player, aged 19 years and 270 days, in all World Cup participations, only behind: Karl-Heinz Schnellinger, Leopold Neumer and Edmund Conen. In the same match, Youssoufa Moukoko was subbed on in the 90th minute, to be the youngest ever, and Musiala became the fifth. On 1 December, he completed 13 dribbles, two shy of Jay-Jay Okocha's record of 15 in 1994, in a 4–2 win over Costa Rica, yet Germany was eliminated from the group stage as they finished third in their group.

Style of play
As a versatile player, Musiala plays both on the wings and at all positions of the midfield. According to Hansi Flick, who gave Musiala his debut at FC Bayern Munich, "He has a great eye and feeling for choosing the right spaces. He is very confident on the ball and can play well between the lines."

Career statistics

Club

International

Germany score listed first, score column indicates score after each Musiala goal

Honours

Bayern Munich
 Bundesliga: 2019–20, 2020–21, 2021–22
 DFL-Supercup: 2020, 2021, 2022
 UEFA Super Cup: 2020
 FIFA Club World Cup: 2020

Individual
IFFHS Men's Youth (U20) World Team: 2021
 Bundesliga Rookie of the Month: April 2021
 kicker Bundesliga Team of the Season: 2021–22
 German national Player of the Year: 2022

References

External links

Profile at the FC Bayern Munich website
Profile at the German Football Association website

2003 births
Living people
Footballers from Stuttgart
English footballers
German footballers
Association football midfielders
FC Bayern Munich footballers
FC Bayern Munich II players
3. Liga players
Bundesliga players
England youth international footballers
England under-21 international footballers
Germany youth international footballers
Germany international footballers
UEFA Euro 2020 players
2022 FIFA World Cup players
English people of German descent
English sportspeople of Nigerian descent
English people of Yoruba descent
English people of Polish descent
German sportspeople of Nigerian descent
German people of Yoruba descent
German people of Polish descent
German emigrants to England